Panama competed at the 1996 Summer Olympics, held in Atlanta, United States.

Results by event

Athletics
Men's 400m Hurdles
Curt Young
 Heat — 55.20s (→ did not advance)

Swimming
Men's 100m Freestyle
 José Isaza
 Heat – 51.66 (→ did not advance, 39th place)

Women's 50m Freestyle
 Eileen Coparropa
 Heat – 26.67 (→ did not advance, 33rd place)

Canoeing
Men's Slalom K-1
Scott Muller
Heat – 242.24 (→ did not advance, 44th place)

See also
Panama at the 1995 Pan American Games

References
Official Olympic Reports

Nations at the 1996 Summer Olympics
1996 Summer Olympics
Olympics